Yuxarı Qaralar (also, Qaralar, Verkhniy Karalar, and Karalar) is a village and municipality in the Imishli Rayon of Azerbaijan.  It has a population of 1,172.

References 

Populated places in Imishli District